Demo_02 is the fifth extended play from South Korean boy band Pentagon. It was released on November 22, 2017, by Cube Entertainment. The album consists of five tracks, including the title track, "Runaway".

Commercial performance
The EP sold 23,257+ copies in South Korea. It peaked at number 8 on the Korean Gaon Chart.

Track listing

Charts

References

2017 EPs
Cube Entertainment EPs
Pentagon (South Korean band) EPs
Kakao M EPs
Korean-language EPs
Albums produced by Hui (singer)
Albums produced by Wooseok
Albums produced by Kino (singer)
Albums produced by Yuto